Raskopino is the name of several rural localities in Russia:
Raskopino, Tver Oblast, a village in Sandovsky District of Tver Oblast
Raskopino, Vologda Oblast, a village in Oktyabrsky Selsoviet of Vologodsky District of Vologda Oblast